Ernst Särgava (born as Karl Ernst Peterson, until 1935 Ernst Peterson, also Ernst Peterson-Särgava; 29 April 1868 Vana-Vändra Parish (now Põhja-Pärnumaa Parish), Kreis Pernau – 12 April 1958 Tallinn) was an Estonian writer, playwright and politician.

1889-1906 he worked as a teacher and schoolmaster in schools in Sindi, Põltsamaa, Kose-Uuemõisa and Rakvere. Since 1906 he was a teacher in various schools in Tallinn.

1907-1918 and 1930-1933 he was a member of Tallinn City Council. He was a member of VI Riigikogu (its Chamber of Deputies).

He died in 1958 and is buried at Metsakalmistu Cemetery.

Works
 1899–1901: three-volume novel series "Paised" ('Dams')
 1904: novel "Rahvavalgustaja" ('Enlightener of the People') 
 1905: novel "Liisi"
 1907: novel "Elsa"

References

External links

1868 births
1958 deaths
People from Põhja-Pärnumaa Parish
People from Kreis Pernau
Patriotic League (Estonia) politicians
Members of the Riigivolikogu
Estonian male writers
Estonian schoolteachers
People's Writers of the Estonian SSR
Recipients of the Order of the White Star, 3rd Class
Recipients of the Military Order of the Cross of the Eagle
Burials at Metsakalmistu